Euploea is a genus of milkweed butterflies. The species are generally dark in coloration, often quite blackish, for which reason they are commonly called crows. As usual for their subfamily, they are poisonous due to feeding on milkweeds and other toxic plants as caterpillars. The latter are aposematically colored to warn off predators from eating them, and the adult butterflies are often mimicked by unrelated species which are not or less poisonous.

Species
Listed alphabetically.
 Euploea albicosta – Biak dark crow
 Euploea alcathoe – no-brand crow, striped black crow
 Euploea alcathoe enastri – Gove crow
 Euploea algea – long-branded blue crow, mournful crow, Algea crow
 Euploea andamanensis – Andaman crow
 Euploea asyllus
 Euploea batesii
 Euploea blossomae – Schaus's crow
 Euploea boisduvali
 Euploea caespes – Murphy's crow
 Euploea camaralzeman – Malayan crow
 Euploea climena
 Euploea configurata – Sulawesi striped blue crow
 Euploea cordelia – Cordelia crow
 Euploea core – common crow
 Euploea crameri – spotted black crow
 Euploea darchia – small brown crow
 Euploea dentiplaga – Seram crow
 Euploea desjardinsii
 Euploea doretta – Pagenstecher's crow
 Euploea doubledayi – striped black crow
 Euploea eboraci – Bismark crow
 Euploea eleusina – Vollenhov's crow
 Euploea eunice – blue-banded king crow
 Euploea eupator – Vanoort's crow
 Euploea euphon – Mascarene crow
 Euploea eurianassa
 Euploea eyndhovii
 Euploea gamelia – Javan crow
 Euploea goudotii
 Euploea hewitsonii – Hewitson's dwarf crow
 Euploea klugii – blue king crow
 Euploea lacon – Spartan crow
 Euploea latifasciata – Weymer's crow, broad-banded crow
 Euploea leucostictos – orange-flash crow
 Euploea lewinii
 Euploea magou – magou crow
 Euploea martinii – Sumatran crow
 Euploea midamus – blue spotted crow
 Euploea mitra – Seychelles crow
 Euploea modesta
 Euploea morosa
 Euploea mulciber – striped blue crow
 Euploea nechos
 Euploea netscheri
 Euploea orontobates

 Euploea phaenareta – great crow, large crow
 Euploea phaenareta juvia – Taiwan or juvia large crow, extinct (1960s)
 Euploea radamanthus – magpie crow
 Euploea redtenbacheri – Malayan crow, Redtenbacher's crow
 ?Euploea rogeri
 Euploea stephensii
 Euploea swainson – Swainson's crow
 Euploea sylvester – double-branded crow
 Euploea tobleri – Tobler's crow
 Euploea transfixa
 Euploea treitschkei
 Euploea tripunctata – Biak threespot crow
 Euploea tulliolus – eastern brown crow, dwarf crow
 Euploea usipetes
 Euploea wallacei
 Euploea westwoodii – Westwood's king crow

Nomenclature
This genus has a large number of junior synonyms, due in part to Moore committing what probably ranks as one of the most drastic cases of oversplitting in the history of zoology:

Crastia Hübner, 1816
Trepsichrois Hübner, 1816
Salpinx Hübner, 1819
Eudaemon Billberg, 1820
Terpsichrois Hübner, 1821 (lapsus)
Euplaea Boisduval, 1832 (lapsus)
Calliploea Butler, 1875
Macroploea Butler, 1878
Stictoploea Butler, 1878
Euplea W.F. Kirby, 1879 (lapsus)
Adigama Moore, 1880
Andasena Moore, 1883
Betanga Moore, 1883
Bibisana Moore, 1883
Chanapa Moore, 1883
Chirosa Moore, 1883
Danisepa Moore, 1883
Deragena Moore, 1883
Gamatoba Moore, 1883
Glinama Moore, 1883
Hirdapa Moore, 1883
Isamia Moore, 1883
Karadira Moore, 1883
Lontara Moore, 1883
Mahintha Moore, 1883
Menama Moore, 1883
Mestapra Moore, 1883
Nacamsa Moore, 1883
Narmada Moore, 1880
Nipara Moore, 1883
Oranasma Moore, 1883
Pademma Moore, 1883
Patosa Moore, 1883
Penoa Moore, 1883
Pramasa Moore, 1883
Pramesta Moore, 1883
Rasuma Moore, 1883
Sabanosa Moore, 1883
Saphara Moore, 1883
Sarobia Moore, 1883
Satanga Moore, 1883
Selinda Moore, 1883
Tabada Moore, 1883
Tagata Moore, 1883
Tiruna Moore, 1883
Tronga Moore, 1883
Vadebra Moore, 1883
Vonona Moore, 1883
Anadara Moore, 1883 (non Gray, 1847: preoccupied)
Doricha Moore, 1883 (non Reichenbach, 1853: preoccupied)
Karadina Moore, 1891 (lapsus)
Chirosia Sharp, 1904 (lapsus)
Daniseppa Fruhstorfer, 1910 (lapsus)
Pamasa Fruhstorfer, 1910 (lapsus)
Rausuma Fruhstorfer, 1910 (lapsus)
Ironga Martin, 1914 (lapsus)
Makroploea Martin, 1915 (lapsus)
Eupolea Hulstaert, 1931 (lapsus)
Ramasa Hulstaert, 1931 (lapsus)

References

External links
 Danaini classification
 Markku Savela's Lepidoptera and Some Other Life Forms: Preliminary species list. Version of May 6, 2007. Retrieved May 20, 2007.

 
Danaini
Nymphalidae genera
Taxa named by Johan Christian Fabricius